Falls the Shadow is an original novel written by Daniel O'Mahony and based on the long-running British science fiction television series Doctor Who. It features the Seventh Doctor, Ace and Bernice. A prelude to the novel, also penned by O'Mahony, appeared in Doctor Who Magazine #218. The title is taken from T. S. Eliot's poem The Hollow Men, a title also used, incidentally, for a Doctor Who novel. The relevant lines of the poem are quoted in the 2007 TV episode The Lazarus Experiment.

External links
Falls the Shadow Prelude

1994 British novels
1994 science fiction novels
Falls the Shadow
Novels by Daniel O'Mahony
Seventh Doctor novels